"Shout" is a song by English pop/rock band Tears for Fears, released as the second single from their second studio album, Songs from the Big Chair (1985), on 23 November 1984. Roland Orzabal is the lead singer on the track. The single became the group's sixth UK top 40 hit, peaking at No. 4 in January 1985. In the US, it reached No. 1 on the Billboard Hot 100 on 3 August 1985 and remained there for three weeks; also topping the Cash Box chart. "Shout" became one of the most successful songs of 1985, eventually reaching No. 1 in multiple countries. It is regarded as one of the most recognizable songs from the mid-eighties, and is recognized by Chris True of AllMusic as a "Tears for Fears signature moment".

Background
While Tears for Fears' previous single "Mothers Talk" had showcased a new, more extroverted songwriting style, "Shout" was completed with power chords, heavy percussion, a synth bass solo and a vocal-sounding synth riff. The song even has a lengthy guitar solo, unusual for Tears for Fears.

Cash Box said that it has "an anthemic chorus and a booming production sound".

Meaning
Song writer Roland Orzabal has noted that the song "is actually more concerned with political protest" than the common view that it is about primal scream theory.

Song versions

"Shout" is by far the most abundantly remixed song in the Tears for Fears catalog, with at least 15 different versions officially released under the band's name.

As was common in the 1980s, the original 12-inch vinyl single featured an extended remix of the song. Three remixes by collaborators Steve Thompson and Michael Barbiero later appeared on American releases of the single, including dub and a cappella versions.

In addition to the 12-inch mixes, "Shout" also appeared in three different 7-inch versions. The original single version released in the UK and much of the rest of the world clocks in at 5:53 and is the same mix of the song found on the Songs from the Big Chair LP, albeit in an edited form. The version released in Germany and Japan is 4:51 in length and fades out during the guitar solo. Meanwhile, the final version released in America is specifically tailored for radio play at a concise 3:59 in length, featuring edits to the chorus and instrumental sections.

Release variations
In addition to the standard 7- and 12-inch releases, the "Shout" single was issued in two collectible formats in the UK: a limited edition 10-inch single and a 7-inch boxed pack featuring a 1985 Tears for Fears calendar. A similar limited edition 7-inch pack was released in Canada, this one featuring a 12-page booklet of band photos. In 1988, "Shout" was reissued on the short-lived CD Video format. The disc included two mixes of the title track, a remix of "Everybody Wants to Rule the World", and the "Shout" music video.

B-side
"The Big Chair" was B-side to the "Shout" single. Though there are no lyrics, the track contains dialogue samples performed by actors Sally Field and William Prince from the 1976 television film Sybil, from which the song (and the album Songs from the Big Chair) takes its name. This is one of the few songs in the Tears for Fears catalogue on which bandmember Curt Smith shares a writing credit. The song has since been included in the band's B-sides and rarities collection Saturnine Martial & Lunatic (1996) as well as the remastered and deluxe edition reissues of Songs from the Big Chair.

Music video
The promotional video for "Shout", filmed in late 1984, was the second Tears for Fears video directed by famed music video producer Nigel Dick. It features footage of Roland Orzabal and Curt Smith at Durdle Door in Dorset, as well as in a studio with the full band (including Ian Stanley and Manny Elias) performing the song amidst a crowd of family and friends. The video reportedly cost only £14,000 to produce.

Along with the clip for "Everybody Wants to Rule the World", the "Shout" video had a big hand in helping establish Tears for Fears in North America due to its heavy airplay on the music video channel MTV.

Track listings

7-inch: Mercury / IDEA8 (United Kingdom, Ireland, South Africa) / 880 294-7 (Australia, Europe) / SOV 2351 (Canada)10-inch: Mercury / IDEA810 (United Kingdom)
"Shout" – 5:53
"The Big Chair" – 3:20

7-inch: Mercury / 880 481-7Q (Germany) / 7PP-167 (Japan)
"Shout [Short Version]" – 4:51
"The Big Chair" – 3:20

7-inch: Mercury / 880 294-7 (United States)
"Shout [US Single Version]" – 3:59
"The Big Chair" – 3:20

12-inch: Mercury / IDEA812 (United Kingdom) / 880 294-1 (Australia, Europe) / SOVX 2351 (Canada) / MIX 3080 (Mexico)
"Shout [Extended Version]" – 7:35
"Shout" – 5:53
"The Big Chair" – 3:20

12-inch: Mercury / 880 929-1 (United States)
"Shout [US Remix]" – 8:02
"Shout [UK Remix]" – 7:40
"The Big Chair" – 3:20

CDV: Mercury / 080 064-2 (United Kingdom)
"Shout" – 5:58
"Everybody Wants to Rule the World [Urban Mix Edit]" – 5:20
"Shout [US Remix]" – 8:00
"Shout [Video]" – 6:00

Charts

Weekly charts

1Remix

Year-end charts

All-time charts

Certifications and sales

*In addition to its Gold certification for 500,000 physical copies sold in the 1980s, "Shout" was awarded a second Gold award by the RIAA in 2012 for 500,000 digital copies sold.

Cover versions
"Shout" has been covered by various artists including:
 Live, by American alternative rock band Concrete Blonde, on their single "Mexican Moon" (1994).
 American metal band Disturbed on their debut album The Sickness (2000), where they also make a reference to Vanilla Ice's "Ice Ice Baby", under the title "Shout 2000".
 Alexis Jordan's "Shout Shout", found on her 2011 self-titled debut album, is based on "Shout".
 In 2012, The Insane Clown Posse did a cover in their cover album "Smothered, Covered & Chunked".
 A cover of "Shout" was included on the self-titled debut album by Scandroid. An official music video was released on 19 November 2016.
 Scottish electronic musician and producer Grum created a rework of the song using lyrics from "Shout" into an electro-trance mix.
 Alternative rock band Placebo released a cover version as a digital single in September 2022.

Shout for England

In 2010, "Shout" was used as the basis for an unofficial anthem of the England football team in the 2010 FIFA World Cup. The new version, performed by Shout for England featuring Dizzee Rascal and James Corden, utilises elements from the Tears for Fears song amid new verses written specifically for the 2010 World Cup. The track also samples "Grandma's Hands" by Bill Withers and was produced by Simon Cowell in association with TalkTalk. It was released on 9 June. On 13 June, the track entered the UK Singles Chart at No. 1.

See also
List of Billboard Hot 100 number-one singles of 1985
List of Cash Box Top 100 number-one singles of 1985
List of Dutch Top 40 number-one singles of 1985
List of European number-one hits of 1985
List of number-one dance singles of 1985 (U.S.)
List of number-one hits of 1985 (Germany)
List of number-one singles in Australia during the 1980s
List of number-one singles of 1985 (Canada)
List of number-one singles from the 1980s (New Zealand)
List of number-one singles of the 1980s (Switzerland)

References

1984 singles
1984 songs
1985 singles
Billboard Hot 100 number-one singles
Cashbox number-one singles
Dutch Top 40 number-one singles
European Hot 100 Singles number-one singles
Mercury Records singles
Music videos directed by Nigel Dick
Number-one singles in Australia
Number-one singles in Germany
Number-one singles in New Zealand
Number-one singles in Switzerland
Phonogram Records singles
RPM Top Singles number-one singles
Song recordings produced by Chris Hughes (record producer)
Songs written by Ian Stanley
Songs written by Roland Orzabal
Tears for Fears songs
Ultratop 50 Singles (Flanders) number-one singles